Tikiri Banda (T.B.) Dissanayake PC (born 17 July 1908, date of death unknown) entered Ceylon University College and obtained a BA degree from London University in 1930, having read Latin, Sinhala, History and Philosophy. He attended Dharmaraja College and Nalanda College, Colombo. After graduating, Dissanayake spent nearly a decade as a teacher at his alma mater Nalanda College Colombo. Later, he entered the Ceylon Law College and was admitted as an advocate of Your Lordship's Court in 1942. Dissanayake also served as a Commissioner of Assize for a short period in 1969-70.

References
 By Sarath MALALASEKERA 
 Daily News - Lakehouse Newspapers 

1908 births
Year of death missing
Sinhalese lawyers
Sri Lankan Buddhists
President's Counsels (Sri Lanka)
Alumni of Nalanda College, Colombo
Alumni of Dharmaraja College
Alumni of the Ceylon University College
People from Kandy
Faculty of Nalanda College, Colombo